The Solnova Solar Power Station is a large CSP power station made up of five separate units of  each. The facility is part of the Solucar Complex, in Sanlúcar la Mayor, in Spain, the same area where the PS20 solar power tower is also located. With the commissioning of the third  unit, the Solnova-IV in August 2010, the power station ranks as one of the largest CSP power stations in the world.

Solnova-I, Solnova-III, and Solnova-IV were commissioned in mid-2010 and are all rated at 50 MWe in installed capacity each. All five plants are built, owned and operated by Abengoa Solar, a Spanish solar power company.

All five power stations, the three commissioned and two under development, will be utilizing parabolic troughs, a technology to use concentrated solar power. The three commissioned power stations are also equipped to support natural gas as its secondary fuel source for power generation.

See also 

 List of power stations in Spain
 List of solar thermal power stations

References 

Solar power stations in Spain
Solar thermal energy